Werewolf is an American horror series, and one of the original shows in the Fox network's broadcast line-up during its inaugural season of 1987–1988.

The show follows the adventures of Eric Cord (John J. York), a college student transformed into a werewolf who undergoes a quest to rid himself of his curse by killing the apparent originator of his 'bloodline', a drifter named Janos Skorzeny (the character's name is a reference to the name of the vampire in the classic TV film The Night Stalker) played by Chuck Connors (in his last television role). While pursuing Skorzeny, Cord himself is pursued by the persistent bounty hunter "Alamo" Joe Rogan (Lance LeGault). Later, Cord hunts Nicholas Remy (Brian Thompson), the real originator of the bloodline.

The show aired a two-hour pilot and 28 half-hour episodes before being cancelled in 1988. In the United Kingdom the series aired on Sky One from 1989–1990.

Synopsis
Eric Cord is a college student whose average life comes to an end on the night that his roommate Ted hands him a gun loaded with silver bullets. Ted is a werewolf who has been killing people, and tells Eric to kill him, seeing this as his only way out. A red pentagram on Ted's right palm is the sign that the metamorphosis is coming. Confronted with Eric's disbelief, Ted decides to prove his situation, and asks Eric to tie him up in a chair and wait until midnight, at which time he'd either see for himself or call in professional help. When midnight comes, Ted transforms into a werewolf, forcing his friend to shoot and kill him – but not before he manages to bite Eric. Before long, Eric discovers a pentagram on his own palm, and soon after undergoes his own transformation into a seven-foot-tall werewolf. Now on the run for his friend's murder, Eric Cord spends the remainder of the series on a quest to find and kill the originator of his bloodline, the mysterious Janos Skorzeny, which will break the curse.

The series was similar in tone and formula to shows like The Fugitive and The Incredible Hulk, but achieved a contemporary feel by mixing a decidedly rock soundtrack with suspense-themed music. Eric wandered from place to place, hitchhiking, taking odd jobs and befriending various characters whose paths he crossed along the way, before invariably being transformed by his werewolf curse just in time to save his new friends from the clutches of some evildoer. Though Eric appeared to have no control over his actions while in werewolf form and typically retained no memory of them afterward, he seemed to prey almost exclusively on villainous characters, never attacking or killing an innocent person. There were hints as the series progressed, however, that this self-control was slowly eroding, as indeed Ted had warned him it would, threatening to destroy Eric's conscience/will if he could not end the curse soon.

Near the end of the series' run it was revealed that the originator of Eric Cord's bloodline was not, in fact, the evil Janos Skorzeny, but rather an even more powerful and malevolent werewolf named Nicholas Remy (played by Brian Thompson). The series ended before Eric could be rid of his curse.

The special effects techniques used in production were considered first-rate and impressive for the time, specifically the transformation sequences, in which, for example, the pentagram-shaped scar on Eric's right hand would rise, thicken and grow three-dimensionally, and begin to bleed.

Replacement of Skorzeny

According to script editor Allan Cole, after the series had started production, Chuck Connors wanted to renegotiate his contract for more money. Various episodes written to feature Skorzeny were shot without Connors—using only scenes with Skorzeny in his werewolf form, plus a human body double with no dialogue. Series creator Frank Lupo asked Cole and Chris Bunch to kill off Skorzeny in "To Dream of Wolves". Connors agreed to return for his finale, according to Cole. The script was originally written as a three-parter with Connors in the first two parts, but two days before shooting Cole and Bunch were informed that Connors would not take part. The first two episodes were collapsed into one, all of Skorzeny's new dialogue was cut (aside from flashback scenes of young Skorzeny played by a different actor), and Skorzeny's part was rewritten to show him cravenly (and silently) kneeling before Remy. In the final fight between Eric and Skorzeny, Eric now scarred his foe with acid and then electrocuted him—allowing Connors' human-form body double to play the death scene in disfiguring makeup.

Production
Parts of the series were shot in Salt Lake City, Utah.

It was co produced by John Ashley.

Characteristics

Traits
The werewolves in the show were immune to the effects of aging or disease, with the exception of Skorzeny himself. Although Skorzeny was apparently a young man as shown in a flashback scene when he was bitten by Nicolas Remy in the 19th century, he appeared to be in his mid sixties in 1987. Nicolas Remy explained to Eric Cord that Skorzeny was slowly dying from a "sickness brought about by his own evil", that was decaying him from within. Nicolas Remy himself was over two thousand years old, yet appeared to be a man in his late 30s with the exception of a streak of gray hair near his right temple.

The werewolves in the series were apparently vulnerable to harm in their human forms from ordinary weapons but with no permanent effects. In an episode titled "A World of Difference", Eric is shot dead in human form (he was just beginning to undergo the metamorphosis), only to resurrect in the morgue by transforming into his werewolf form at sunset. In another episode titled "Nightmare at the Braine Hotel", Eric meets a werewolf named Servan, who tells him a story in which he had been executed by hanging in his human form. He seemed greatly amused by the memory of the looks on his executioners' faces as he leapt off the undertaker's table when he transformed at sunset and rose from death. Another werewolf character, a hobo named Hank who was featured in the episode "King of the Road", dies in his human form from having his throat cut, only to resurrect in his werewolf form as soon as night falls. This ability is reminiscent of the "Eddie Quist" character in "The Howling", who is shot dead by police during the beginning of his transformation at the adult movie theater, only to come to life later by transforming in the morgue.

The werewolves themselves transformed into large, almost bearlike bipedal wolves with long simian arms that allowed them to run on all fours as well as two. All the werewolves transformed by sprouting fangs, claws and fur, except for Skorzeny, who peeled back the skin of his face to reveal the werewolf form within. In their human forms they had no traditionally distinguishing marks, such as eyebrows meeting over the bridge of their nose, or hair on the palms of their hands. It was also never explored as to whether or not werewolves could reproduce sexually in their human bodies.

Although the werewolves did completely recover from wounds made by non-silver weapons, the series never explored whether or not werewolves could regenerate missing limbs. Skorzeny, who wore an eye patch over his left eye, did seem to regenerate his missing eye when he transformed into his werewolf form. But when he returned to his human form, he once again wore the eye patch. It was explained that Remy is the one who cut out his eye in the episode "To Dream of Wolves."

Werewolves in this series did not transform during the full moon; The pentagram on their palm was the only signal that the metamorphosis was approaching. In the pilot, Eric Cord's roommate Ted stated that its appearance was very random, and that he had not discerned any pattern to when or how often the metamorphosis would occur. Older werewolves like Skorzeny and Remy had the ability to induce the metamorphosis without the appearance of the pentagram, unlike Eric, who seemed to be at the mercy of the curse's cycle. In the episode "To Dream of Wolves", Remy also showed an ability to shapeshift single body parts at will, as shown when he shapeshifted his right arm into its werewolf shape to kill Dianne for disobeying his order to kill Eric. Remy also seemed to have a form of psychic control over those of his bloodline: In "To Dream of Wolves", he toys with Eric by telepathically forcing him to press a silver dagger to his own throat, drawing blood.

Shapeshifting into a werewolf
While the bite of a werewolf was the standard way to pass the curse to another person, blood transfusion appeared to be effective in the episode titled "Big Daddy". No mystical talismans, salves or hexes seemed to have any place in the series. It was also never suggested that the curse was hereditary.

Vulnerabilities
The werewolves had only three known weaknesses mentioned in the series: Any weapon made from silver, being killed by another werewolf or suicide.

Bloodlines
Eric is told of other bloodlines by Gray Wolf in the episode of the same name. It is unknown if it is a complete list or just the bloodlines that he knew of.
Nicholas Remy
Janos Skorzeny
Ted Nichols
Eric Cord
Yuzora
Gray Wolf
Blackfoot
Blackwolf
Mather
Pilatzi
Mendez
Kadar
Howard

Episodes

In other media
In July 1988, Blackthorne Publishing released a five-issue comic book series based on the show.

Syndication
From 2007 to 2009, Chiller aired reruns of Werewolf. Chiller premiered the series with a marathon on June 6, 2007.

Home media
The two-hour pilot was released in the UK in PAL VHS format by Entertainment in Video.

Werewolf: The Complete Series was to be released on DVD by Shout! Factory by October 6, 2009, but was later pushed back two weeks to October 20, 2009 to include special features. The release was eventually cancelled because of a music license issue concerning 3 songs.

Werewolf: The Complete Series was released in France by Elephant Films on October 26, 2020.

References

External links
  (Pilot)
 

1987 American television series debuts
1988 American television series endings
1980s American horror television series
English-language television shows
Fox Broadcasting Company original programming
Television series by Sony Pictures Television
Television about werewolves
Television shows filmed in Utah
Television series created by Frank Lupo